Shape the Future is the eighth studio album by Nightmares on Wax. It was released in 2018 on Warp. It peaked at number 19 on the UK Independent Albums Chart.

Critical reception

At Metacritic, which assigns a weighted average score out of 100 to reviews from mainstream critics, the album received an average score of 71, based on 9 reviews, indicating "generally favorable reviews".

Paul Carr of PopMatters gave the album 7 out of 10 stars, calling it "N.O.W's strongest and most cohesive album since the imperious In a Space Outta Sound." Katie Hawthorne of The Skinny gave the album 4 out of 5 stars, writing, "You'll feel like you've heard these songs on the breeze before, or snatched them from the window of a passing car, but you couldn't have caught them without Nightmares on Wax's expert navigation."

Track listing

Charts

References

External links
 

2018 albums
Nightmares on Wax albums
Warp (record label) albums